The 2022 Sheffield City Council election took place on 5 May 2022 to elect members of Sheffield City Council in England, as part of the nationwide local elections. One seat from each ward was up for election.

This was the first election held since the formation of a Labour-Green coalition, which was established in 2021 following the loss of Labour's overall majority on the council. Following the election the council remains No Overall Control.

Overall election result

Ward results
Incumbents are denoted by an asterisk (*). Turnout includes rejected ballots.

Beauchief & Greenhill

Beighton

Birley

Broomhill & Sharrow Vale

Burngreave

City

Crookes & Crosspool

Darnall

Dore & Totley

East Ecclesfield

Ecclesall

Firth Park

Fulwood

Gleadless Valley

Graves Park

Hillsborough

Manor Castle

Mosborough

Nether Edge & Sharrow

Park & Arbourthorne

Richmond

Shiregreen & Brightside

Southey

Stannington

Stocksbridge & Upper Don

Walkley

West Ecclesfield

Woodhouse

References

Sheffield
2020s in Sheffield
Sheffield City Council elections